is a railway station in the city of Toyokawa, Aichi Prefecture, Japan, operated by Central Japan Railway Company (JR Tōkai).

Lines
Aichi-Mito Station is served by the Tōkaidō Main Line, and is located 302.1 kilometers from the southern terminus of the line at Tokyo Station.

Station layout
The station has one side platform and one island platform connected by a footbridge. The station building has automated ticket machines, TOICA automated turnstiles and is staffed.

Platforms

Adjacent stations

|-
!colspan=5|Central Japan Railway Company

Station history
Aichi-Mito Station first opened on September 1, 1888, as  when the section of the Japanese Government Railways (JGR) line connecting Hamamatsu with Ōbu was completed. From April 1, 1895, this became the Tōkaidō Main Line. The station was burned down during the Toyokawa Air Raid of 1945, and a new station building was completed in April 1948. The JGR became the JNR after World War II and on August 1, 1948, the station name was changed to its present name. Regularly scheduled freight services were discontinued in 1971, and parcel services by 1984. With the dissolution and privatization of the JNR on April 1, 1987, the station came under the control of the Central Japan Railway Company (JR Tōkai). Automated turnstiles using the TOICA IC Card system came into operation from November 18, 2001.

Station numbering was introduced to the section of the Tōkaidō Line operated JR Central in March 2018; Aichi-Mito Station was assigned station number CA44.

Passenger statistics
In fiscal 2017, the station was used by an average of 1362 passengers daily.

Surrounding area
former Mito Town Hall
 Mito Junior High School

See also
 List of Railway Stations in Japan

References
Yoshikawa, Fumio. Tokaido-sen 130-nen no ayumi. Grand-Prix Publishing (2002) .

External links

Railway stations in Japan opened in 1888
Railway stations in Aichi Prefecture
Tōkaidō Main Line
Stations of Central Japan Railway Company
Toyokawa, Aichi